Robert Vaughan Gorle VC  (6 May 1896 – 9 January 1937) was an English recipient of the Victoria Cross, the highest and most prestigious award for gallantry in the face of the enemy that can be awarded to British and Commonwealth forces.

Gorle was born in Southsea on 6 May 1896 and educated at Malvern College and Rugby School. Prior to the First World War was a farmer in South Africa.

Captain Gorle was promoted to temporary lieutenant in "A" Battery, 50th Brigade, Royal Field Artillery, British Army at Ledeghem, Belgium, during the First World War when he performed the deed for which he was awarded the Victoria Cross. According to VCs of the First World War: The Final Days 1918 by Gerald Gliddon, young Mr Gorle won his award on 1 October. It was the fourth and last battle of Ypres when 50th Brigade supported an attack at the village of Ledegham. The attack began at 06H15 for about 30 minutes of artillery fire. Neither allied troops to the left or right of the British troops had been able to make any progress against the enemy, even with the artillery. This resulted in the line of British troops faltering and beginning to retreat to the north of Ledegham. Upon seeing this, Mr Gorle took it upon himself to charge his gun at the enemy and fire over open sights, not once but three times. When the 38th (Ulster) division saw such gallantry and bravery in the face of the enemy infantry, they rallied to Gorle, and his men with the 18-pounder, and overcame the enemy machine gunner nests on Hill 41. Gorle was decorated nine months and 18 days later in the Quadrangle of Buckingham Palace by King George VI on 19 June 1919. It was a proud moment for his family after his father, Major Harry Vaughan Gorle D.S.O A.S.C., had only narrowly missed being awarded the V.C. too, receiving instead, the DSO for his efforts in the Boer Wars in South Africa.

His citation in the London Gazette of 14 December 1918 reads:

After the war Gorle returned to Africa, eventually settling in Southern Rhodesia where he was appointed as Sergeant-at-Arms to the Southern Rhodesian Legislative Assembly. He died on 9 January 1937 of yellow fever and was buried in Stellawood Cemetery, Durban, South Africa.

His VC is on display in the Lord Ashcroft Gallery at the Imperial War Museum, London after being purchased privately in 1993 through an agent from an unknown private seller whom is thought to have been Kevin Patience.

References

Further reading
Monuments to Courage (David Harvey, 1999)
The Register of the Victoria Cross (This England, 1997)
VCs of the First World War - The Final Days 1918 (Gerald Gliddon, 2000)

1896 births
1937 deaths
Royal Artillery officers
British Army personnel of World War I
British World War I recipients of the Victoria Cross
People from Southsea
People educated at Rugby School
People educated at Malvern College
English emigrants to South Africa
South African farmers
British Army recipients of the Victoria Cross
Military personnel from Portsmouth